Juan Carlos Nájera (13 February 1981) is a triple jumper and coach born in the Guatemalan department of Zacapa. He began his career in 1992 when his older brother took him to compete in a 100m race, motivating him to continue in athletics. He studied at the Institute of Business Administration in Zacapa and the Universidad de San Carlos de Guatemala, where he earned a BA in Biology.

Personal bests
Long jump: 7.16 m –  Guatemala City, 7 Jul 2007
Triple jump: 15.78 m –  Guatemala City, 6 Jul 2007

Achievements

Further results as an athlete
2007
1st place. University of Miami Open, USA: 15.35m
1st place. 1st Central America, Dominican Republic and Puerto Rico Athletic Meet, Guatemala city, Guatemala: 15.78m

External links
 
 http://www.iaaf.org/athletes/guatemala/juan-c-najera-225702

1981 births
Living people
Guatemalan male athletes
Guatemalan triple jumpers
Male triple jumpers
Universidad de San Carlos de Guatemala alumni
People from Zacapa Department
Central American Games silver medalists for Guatemala
Central American Games medalists in athletics